Aphaenogaster huachucana is a species of ant in the family Formicidae.

Subspecies
These two subspecies belong to the species Aphaenogaster huachucana:
 Aphaenogaster huachucana crinimera Cole, 1953 i c g
 Aphaenogaster huachucana huachucana Creighton, 1934 i c g
Data sources: i = ITIS, c = Catalogue of Life, g = GBIF, b = Bugguide.net

References

Further reading

External links

 

huachucana
Articles created by Qbugbot
Insects described in 1934